LEP is the Large Electron–Positron Collider, a particle accelerator.

LEP or Lep may also refer to:

Science
 Laser Excited Phosphor, great beam distance light powered by a laser
 Light emitting plasma, or plasma lamps
 Light emitting polymer
 Lep, an abbreviation for Lepus (constellation)
 LEP, an alias for leptin, a gene
 Laser evoked potentials, in neuralgia
 The liquid entry pressure (LEP) of a hydrophobic membrane

Organisations
 Liberal Egyptian Party 
 Local ecumenical partnership or local ecumenical project
 Local enterprise partnership, a type of partnership between government and the business community for economic development in England

Other uses
 Lower Elements Police, a police squad in the Artemis Fowl children's novels
 Limited English proficiency, in English language learning and teaching
 Lancashire Evening Post, an English newspaper

See also
 Leps (disambiguation)
 Lepidoptera, an order of insects that includes moths and butterflies